PLCH may stand for:

 Plch, a municipality in the Czech Republic
 The Public Library of Cincinnati and Hamilton County, a public library system in Cincinnati, Ohio, United States
 Pulmonary Langerhans' cell histiocytosis, a type of interstitial lung disease
Cassidy International Airport, an airport with the ICAO airport code PLCH